The 1979 Eastern 8 Conference baseball tournament was held in May 1979 to determine the champion of the NCAA Division I Eastern 8 Conference, renamed in 1982 as the Atlantic 10 Conference, for the 1979 NCAA Division I baseball season.  This was the first iteration of the event, and was held at Hershey High School and Lower Dauphin High School in Hershey, Pennsylvania.   earned the first championship and the conference's automatic bid to the 1979 NCAA Division I baseball tournament.

Format
The tournament followed a double-elimination format, with two teams (George Washington and Duquesne) receiving first round byes.

Bracket

References

Championship Series
Atlantic 10 Conference Baseball Tournament
Eastern 8 Conference Baseball Championship Series
Eastern 8 Conference Baseball Championship Series
Baseball in Pennsylvania
College sports in Pennsylvania
Hershey, Pennsylvania
History of Dauphin County, Pennsylvania
Sports competitions in Pennsylvania
Tourist attractions in Dauphin County, Pennsylvania